Rossi Boots is a South Australian boot manufacturer founded in 1910. The business continues to operate both the factory and headquarters in Kilburn, South Australia.

Rossiters Pty Ltd is still owned by the Rossiter family.  

Over the 110-year history the business has made boots for a wide range of people, industries and uses. Rossi Boots have a vast network of international and local distributors.

History 
Rossi Boots started in 1910 when Arthur Edward Rossiter resigned from his position as a supervisor at the Adelaide Boot Company and started Rossiters Ltd in a small tin shed in his own backyard. Sales were initially slow, but increased due to the First World War.

A bigger and larger factory was needed so the first of three stages of factory was built. The depression years were hard years and getting orders proved difficult. During the Second World War Rossi Boots was a major supplier to the military making hundreds of thousands of boots which saw service in various theatres including New Guinea. The war years saw the number of employees peak at around five hundred.

In the years after the war, materials were scarce and it was then when the company introduced the concept of using old car tyres as a soling for boots.

Gradually since then the methods of manufacturing footwear have changed as petroleum based products such as glues, rubbers and plastics have replaced the traditional ones of leather, nails and threads. More modern machinery has been introduced than can directly mould soles to the bottom of boots and can easily pull leather over a last.

At the end of 1987 the company moved from Unley to Hilton.  The move allowed production to be carried out in a more modern, fit-for-purpose factory. Since then the company has continued to change; introducing computer controlled machines for cutting, sewing and attaching soles. These changes occurred whilst many of Rossi's competitors moved offshore. Whilst the introduction of these machines reduced the number of local staff, it has enabled Rossi Boots to continue to manufacture in Australia.

In March 2019 Rossi Boots relocated the factory, warehouse and headquarters from Hilton to Kilburn, South Australia. This move to a new, expansive location allows Rossi Boots to continue to manufacture boots in South Australia and continue to house all operations under one roof.

See also

List of oldest companies in Australia
List of South Australian manufacturing businesses

References

External links

Sly, D. Family business stays at home. The Adelaide Review
13 Jul 13 – Defence snubs SA made Rossi Boots in favour of imports for defence workers Adelaide Now]
21 Jul 15 – Rossi Boots export grant after missing defence contract ABC Online
19 Apr 17 – Rossi Boots lost a Federal Government contract and has called for a change to the system Adelaide Now
20 Apr 2017 – Rossi Boots has received support from Labour MP Steve Georganas Adelaide Now
8 Aug 2017 – Rossi Boots third generation bootmaker and former Chairman Dean Rossiter passes away Adelaide Now

Shoe companies of Australia
Manufacturing companies based in Adelaide
Clothing companies established in 1910
Australian companies established in 1910
Workwear
Australian military uniforms
Military boots